Edouard Levier (1 April 1896 – 25 November 1976) was a French racing cyclist. He rode in the 1929 Tour de France.

References

1896 births
1976 deaths
French male cyclists
Place of birth missing